Alexander John Bruce-Lockhart, Baron Bruce-Lockhart,  (4 May 1942 – 14 August 2008), commonly known as Sandy Bruce-Lockhart, was a British Conservative politician and a senior figure in English local government. He was the leader of Kent County Council and then Chairman of the Local Government Association. He was succeeded in the latter post by Simon Milton, ex-Leader of Westminster Council.

Early life
Bruce-Lockhart was born on 4 May 1942 into the Scottish Bruce Lockhart family, which held close ties to the diplomatic service. His father, John Bruce Lockhart, was deputy director of MI6 and a university administrator. His mother was Margaret Evelyn Hone. He was educated at the Dragon School, Sedbergh, and the Royal Agricultural College, Cirencester.

He was the younger brother of James Bruce Lockhart (1941–2018), a diplomat, intelligence officer, author, and artist.

Career
He left the United Kingdom to work in the then Rhodesia (now Zimbabwe), managing a large farm for a South African owner. After a period in Australia, he returned to live in Kent in 1968, where he had a dairy farm, then a  fruit farm, in Headcorn.

He became a county councillor for Maidstone Rural East in 1989. At the time he was chairman of a rail committee in the Weald of Kent preservation society, which had been protesting about what he then regarded as the destructive route of the Channel tunnel rail link. He became leader of the opposition Conservative group in 1993 and leader of the Council in 1997, retaining the post until 2005. While leader of Kent County Council, Bruce-Lockhart became a controversial figure on the national political stage for his introduction of a local version of the recently repealed anti-gay Section 28 legislation. In July 2004, having been vice-chairman for two years, Lord Bruce-Lockhart succeeded Sir Jeremy Beecham to become Chairman of the Local Government Association, following the Conservatives becoming the largest political group in the Association as the result of the local elections in May.

He was made a Knight Bachelor in the New Year's Honours List of December 2002, having previously been appointed OBE. On 11 April 2006, it was announced that he was to be elevated to a life peerage, and on 9 June 2006 he was gazetted as Baron Bruce-Lockhart, of The Weald in the County of Kent. On 24 May 2007 it was announced that he had been appointed as Chair of English Heritage.

On 17 June 2008, Lord Bruce-Lockhart was made an honorary Freeman of the City of Canterbury. After a battle with cancer, he died in 2008, aged 66.

Personal life
In 1966, Bruce-Lockhart married Tess Pressland, and they had two sons and a daughter.

Death
He died on 14 August 2008.

References

1942 births
2008 deaths
Alumni of the Royal Agricultural University
Sandy
Conservative Party (UK) life peers
Knights Bachelor
Officers of the Order of the British Empire
People educated at The Dragon School
People educated at Sedbergh School
People from Maidstone
Politicians from Wakefield
Deaths from cancer in England
Members of Kent County Council
Life peers created by Elizabeth II
Chairs of the Local Government Association